Kyalanur  is a village in the southern state of Karnataka, India. It is located in the Kolar taluk of Kolar district in Karnataka.

Demographics
 India census, Kyalanur had a population of 6493 with 3406 males and 3087 females.
pin code 563102

See also
 Kolar
 Districts of Karnataka

References

External links
 http://Kolar.nic.in/

Villages in Kolar district